Vraný is a market town in Kladno District in the Central Bohemian Region of the Czech Republic. It has about 800 inhabitants.

Administrative parts
Villages of Horní Kamenice and Lukov are administrative parts of Vraný.

Geography
It lies in the Lower Eger Table.

History
The first written mention of Vraný is from 1228, when is was property of Basilica of Saint George in Prague. After it changes several less important owners, it was acquire by the Zajíc of Hazenburk family in 1434, who owned it until 1534. During their rule in 1513, Vraný was promoted to a market town by King Vladislaus II. The market town was badly damaged during the Thirty Years' War and lost most of its inhabitants, but it recovered. From 1706 to 1945, Vraný was owned by the Metropolitan Chapter at Saint Vitus.

In 1980, the municipalities of Horní Kamenice and Lukov were annexed to Vraný.

Sights
The Vraný Castle was built for the Metropolitan Chapter at Saint Vitus in 1764–1769. It is a small late Baroque residence with a Rococo façade. Today it houses a retirement home.

The Church of Saint John the Baptist was built in 1756–1761. It is a late Baroque church, which replaced an old Gothic building that fell into disrepair during the Thirty Years' War. The tower was rebuilt in 1908 by the architect Josef Fanta.

The Church of Saint George in Lukov was originally a Romanesque rotunda, probably from the 13th century. In the 18th century, it was compeltely rebuilt into its current Baroque form.

Notable people
Jaroslav Věšín (1860–1915), painter

References

External links

Populated places in Kladno District
Market towns in the Czech Republic